The Strigolniki (singular Strigólnik–  in Russian) were followers of a Russian religious sect in the middle of the 14th and first half of the 15th century, established in Pskov and later in Novgorod and Tver.
The origins of the name remain unclear. Some historians believe it has something to do with handicrafts that the first Strigolniki were engaged in, such as cloth-cutting or hairdressing (it appears that the word strigolnik derives from the Russian root strig-, which connotes cutting or trimming. Others think the name comes from a special initiation ceremony (a specific haircut, or strizhka), performed by a deacon named Karp – a supposed founder of the sect (together with deacon Nikita) yet others think it could mean that these people refused to either grow a beard or cut their beards when they entered churches.

Active participants of the sect were tradespeople and low-ranking clergy. They renounced all ecclesiastic hierarchy and monasticism, sacraments done by Orthodox clergy due to recognizing the Orthodox priesthood as illegitimate: priesthood, communion, penance, and baptism, which had been accompanied by large fees ("extortions", in their view) to the benefit of the clergy. Criticizing and exposing the venality, vices, and ignorance of the priests, the Strigolniki demanded the right to a religious sermon for laymen. Their sermons were full of social motifs: they reproached the rich for enslaving the free and the poor.

Beliefs 
There is some debate if Strigolniki were "heretical",  if they were a proto-Protestant movement inside Orthodoxy, being similar to Lollardy or the Hussites or if they merely opposed the priesthood. The Strigolniki movement has been suggested to have had Iconoclastic tendencies, though it is not clear if they came out against the use of icons, it is clearer that they came out against monasticism. The Strigolniki opposed the Orthodox church, refusing to recognize its bishops and priests, the Strigolniki denied going to Orthodox churches and instead gathered in separate meetings. They are also known to have criticized Orthodox priests whom they called "drunkards".

Karetnikova suggested that the Strigolniki were a response to changes in the Orthodox church, wanting to return from ritualism to the simplicity of New Testament Christianity, emphasizing the spiritual meaning of the sacraments and basing their views primarily on scripture, seeing it as their ultimate authority. Petrushko on the other hand argued that In the attitude of the Strigolniki about the Church and Church hierarchy, though there are some similarities with Bogomils and Cathars, based on surviving sources they didn't have a dogmatic system of theology and did not disagree with the Orthodox church about Christology and on soteriology, instead most of their disagreements being with ecclesiology. Petrushko, judging by the fact that the Photius believed it possible to return the Strigolniki to the Church, their disagreement with Orthodox dogma was not as dramatic as among the Sect of Skhariya the Jew.

M. V. Pechnikov argued that the Strigolniki merely rejected the Orthodox priesthood, simony and confession to clergy, while not denying the sacraments of the Orthodox church nor most dogma.

Obolensky has instead suggested that the Strigolniki were born from Bogomil or Cathar missionaries in Russia during the time of the Kievan Rus.

Stephen of Perm said that the Strigolniki do not confess their sins to clergy but instead to the ground, however the meaning of what Stephen of Perm meant is not clear.

History 

Deacon Karp found many followers in Pskov, but had to move to Novgorod to avoid persecution. Some scholars argue that Archbishop of Novgorod Vasilii Kalika (1330–1352) ignored the heresy, but that his successors, Moisei (1325–1330; 1352–1359), and Aleksei (1359–1388) took firm measures against the heretics. In 1375, enraged citizens of Novgorod threw three heretics from the bridge into the Volkhov River. Beginning in 1382, the sect was opposed by Archbishop Dionysios of Suzdal.

Stephen or Perm wrote a letter to Nilus of Constantinople in 1382 about the Strigolniki.

However, the teachings of the Strigolniki lived on. They spread widely  in Novgorod, in Pskov, and also in Tver, where bishops Feodor Dobry and Yevfimiy Vislen came forward with support for the movement. In the early 15th century Photius, Metropolitan of Kiev and all Russia, denounced the Strigolniki teachings. 

The Strigolniki disappeared during the 15th century due to persecution.

The last mention of the Strigolniki came in 1487.

See also 

 Protestantism in Russia
 Spiritual Christianity

References 

Christian denominations in Russia
14th-century Eastern Orthodoxy
15th-century Eastern Orthodoxy
Novgorod Republic
History of Pskov
Eastern Orthodoxy in medieval Russia